James Elliott Connor (July 7, 1904 – December 7, 1995) was an American politician in the state of Florida.

Connor was born in Gadsden, Alabama, to Claude Eugene and Ruby Clayton (Dunklin) Connor. The family moved to Florida in 1907. Connor attended public schools in Marion County, graduated from Citrus County High School in 1922, and attended the University of Florida. He was a business fuel oil distributor and  rancher. Connor served in the Florida State Senate from 1955 to 1965 as a Democratic member for the 9th district.

References

1904 births
1995 deaths
Politicians from Gadsden, Alabama
People from Brooksville, Florida
University of Florida alumni
Businesspeople from Florida
Democratic Party Florida state senators
Pork Chop Gang
20th-century American politicians
20th-century American businesspeople